DMT is an abbreviation of N,N-Dimethyltryptamine, a naturally occurring psychedelic compound.

DMT may also refer to:

Chemical substances 
 Desoxymethyltestosterone, a designer anabolic steroid
 Dimethyl terephthalate, a polyester precursor
 DMT1, a transporter involved in human iron metabolism
 Dimethylglycine N-methyltransferase, an enzyme
 DMTMM (4-(4,6-dimethoxy-1,3,5-triazin-2-yl)-4-methyl-morpholinium chloride) an amide-coupling reagent
 Dimethoxytrityl, a protecting group used in oligonucleotide synthesis

Other uses in science and technology 
 Discrete multitone modulation, a form of orthogonal frequency-division multiplexing (OFDM)
 Definite Minimum Time, a term specific to protective relays
 UTC−00:25 (Dublin Mean Time), which was 25 minutes behind Greenwich Mean Time 1880–1916

Other uses 
 Diving medical technician, a certification offered in the United States by the NBDHMT
 Dʿmt, a historical kingdom in what is now Eritrea and northern Ethiopia
 Dignified Mobile Toilets, a Nigerian mobile toilet company
 Double mini trampoline, a discipline of gymnastics